Ted "Square" Kilmurray (born 18 August 1934) is a former Australian rules footballer who played with East Perth in the West Australian National Football League between 1953 and 1966 for a total of 257 games.

Kilmurrary was often used on the half forward flanks but also played as a key position forward and ruck-rover. He was a good exponent of the flick pass and won East Perth's Best and Fairest in 1958, breaking teammate Graham Farmer's sequence of four in a row. That year he also won a Sandover Medal as best player in the competition as voted for by the umpires. He was a three time premiership player with East Perth and represented Western Australia at interstate football on four occasions.

In 2005 Kilmurray was named on the interchange bench in the official Indigenous Team of the Century.

References

External links

1934 births
Living people
Indigenous Australian players of Australian rules football
East Perth Football Club players
Sandover Medal winners
West Australian Football Hall of Fame inductees
Australian rules footballers from Western Australia
Indigenous Australians from Western Australia
People from Wiluna, Western Australia